Reynal and Hitchcock was a publishing company in New York City. Founded in 1933 by Eugene Reynal and Curtice Hitchcock, in 1948 it was absorbed by Harcourt, Brace.

Publishings
The Little Prince, a 1943 illustrated classic by Antoine de Saint-Exupery
Strange Fruit, a 1944 bestselling novel debut by American author Lillian Smith

See also
 List of publishers

References

Publishing companies established in 1933
Book publishing companies based in New York City
1933 establishments in New York City
Publishing companies disestablished in 1948
1948 disestablishments in New York (state)
1948 mergers and acquisitions